Edward J. DeBartolo may refer to:
Edward J. DeBartolo Sr. (1909–1994), shopping mall developer
Edward J. DeBartolo Jr. (born 1946), former owner of the San Francisco 49ers, son of the above